Real Arroyo Seco (2004–10) was a football club from Arroyo Seco in Santa Fe, Argentina that played in Torneo Argentino B, the regionalised fourth tier of the Argentine Football Association league system.

The club was founded in 2004, making them one of the youngest football teams in Argentina. They were promoted from Torneo Argentino B at the end of the 2005–06 season after beating Club Atlético Candelaria 4–2 on aggregate in a promotion/relegation playoff. At the end of the 2008–09 season the club were automatically relegated back to Argentino B. At the end of the 2009-2010 season, after being relegated for the second consecutive season, the club was dissolved.

The club won five titles during its tenure: Liga Regional del Sud in 2004, 2005, 2006 and 2007 and Torneo del Interior in 2005.

See also
List of football clubs in Argentina
Argentine football league system

References

External links
 Club Website

Real Arroyo Seco
Association football clubs established in 2004
Association football clubs disestablished in 2010
2004 establishments in Argentina
2010 disestablishments in Argentina